The Normandy Park Historic District  is a  historic district located along Normandy Parkway, between Columbia Turnpike and Madison Avenue, in the Convent Station section of Morris Township in Morris County, New Jersey. 

It was added to the National Register of Historic Places on December 6, 1996, for its significance in architecture and community planning. The district has 17 contributing buildings and 9 contributing objects.

History and description
Normandy Park is a residential development of villa estates located near Morristown. It was designed by John Dodd Canfield (1845–1910), starting in 1885. George Augustus Mills, a local carpenter, contractor and architect, built many of the first buildings. The district includes examples of Queen Anne, Colonial Revival, and Tudor Revival architectures. 

The Red House at 20 Normandy Parkway was built  and features Georgian Revival architecture. The house, owned by James Henry Coghill, Sr., was designed by Morristown architect Robert C. Walsh.  In 1891, Henry E. Woodward built a summer residence here, which he name Fairacres. It was later bought by Charles F. Clark, president of the Bradstreet Company, now Dun & Bradstreet. His daughter, E. Mabel Clark, used the house until her death. It was later demolished and a new house built on the property in 1955.

See also
 National Register of Historic Places listings in Morris County, New Jersey

References

External links
 
 

Morris Township, New Jersey	
National Register of Historic Places in Morris County, New Jersey
Historic districts on the National Register of Historic Places in New Jersey
New Jersey Register of Historic Places